Martin Slaninka (born 26 March 1996) is a Slovak professional footballer who plays for FK Třinec as a left-back.

Club career
Slaninka made his Fortuna Liga debut for Sereď against Spartak Trnava on 21 July 2019, playing 90 minutes of the 2–0 loss and being booked with a yellow card in the second half.

References

External links
 SKF Sereď official profile
 Futbalnet profile
 
 

1996 births
Living people
Sportspeople from Žilina
Slovak footballers
Association football defenders
MŠK Žilina players
FK Frýdek-Místek players
1. SK Prostějov players
ŠKF Sereď players
MFK Dukla Banská Bystrica players
FK Fotbal Třinec players
2. Liga (Slovakia) players
Czech National Football League players
Slovak Super Liga players
Slovak expatriate footballers
Expatriate footballers in the Czech Republic
Slovak expatriate sportspeople in the Czech Republic